Francisco Antônio de Moraes Accioli Dória (born 1945, Rio de Janeiro, Brazil) is a Brazilian mathematician, philosopher, and genealogist. Francisco Antônio Dória received his B.S. in Chemical Engineering from the Federal University of Rio de Janeiro (UFRJ), Brazil, in 1968 and then got his doctorate from the Brazilian Center for Research in Physics (CBPF), advised by Leopoldo Nachbin in 1977. Dória worked for a while at the Physics Institute of UFRJ, and then left to become a Professor of the Foundations of Communications at the School of Communications, also at UFRJ. Dória held visiting positions at the University of Rochester (NY), Stanford University (CA) (here as a Senior Fulbright Scholar), and the University of São Paulo (USP). His most prolific period spawned from his collaboration with Newton da Costa, a Brazilian logician and one of the founders of paraconsistent logic, which began in 1985. He is currently Professor of Communications, Emeritus, at UFRJ and a member of the Brazilian Academy of Philosophy.

His main achievement (with Brazilian logician and philosopher Newton da Costa) is the proof that chaos theory is undecidable (published in 1991), and when properly axiomatized within classical set theory, is incomplete in the sense of Gödel. The decision problem for chaotic dynamical systems had been formulated by mathematician Morris Hirsch.

More recently da Costa and Dória introduced a formalization for the P = NP hypothesis that they called the “exotic formalization,” and showed in a series of papers that axiomatic set theory together with exotic P = NP is consistent if set theory is consistent. They then prove:

If exotic P = NP together with axiomatic set theory is ω-consistent, then axiomatic set theory + P = NP is consistent.

(So far nobody has advanced a proof of the ω-consistency of set theory + exotic P = NP.) They also showed that the equivalence between exotic P = NP and the usual formalization for P = NP, is independent of set theory and holds of the standard integers. If set theory plus that equivalence condition has the same provably total recursive functions as plain set theory, then the consistency of P = NP with set theory follows.

Dória is also interested in the theories of hypercomputation and in the foundations of economic theory.

References

N. C. A. da Costa and F. A. Dória, "Undecidability and incompleteness in classical mechanics," Int. J. Theor. Physics vol. 30, pp. 1041–1073 (1991)
 Proves that chaos theory is undecidable and, if axiomatized within set theory, incomplete in the sense of Gödel.

N. C. A. da Costa and F. A. Dória, "An undecidable Hopf bifurcation with an undecidable fixed point," Int. J. Theor. Physics vol. 33, pp. 1885–1903 (1994).
 Settles a question raised by V. I. Arnold in the list of problems drawn up at the 1974 American Mathematical Society Symposium on the Hilbert Problems: is the stability problem for stationary points algorithmically decidable?

I. Stewart, "Deciding the undecidable," Nature vol. 352, pp. 664–665 (1991).
I. Stewart, From Here to Infinity, Oxford (1996).
 Comments on the undecidability proof for chaos theory.

J. Barrow, Impossibility – The Limits of Science and the Science of Limits, Oxford (1998).
 Describes the solution of Arnold's stability problem.

S. Smale, "Problem 14: Lorenz attractor," in V. I. Arnold et al., Mathematics, Frontiers and Perspectives, pp. 285–286, AMS and IMU (2000).
 Summarizes the obstruction to decidability in chaos theory described by da Costa and Dória.

 F. A. Dória and J. F. Costa, "Special issue on hypercomputation," Applied Mathematics and Computation vol. 178 (2006).
N. C. A. da Costa and F. A. Dória, "Consequences of an exotic formulation for P = NP," Applied Mathematics and Computation vol. 145, pp. 655–665 (2003) and vol. 172, pp. 1364–1367 (2006).
 The criticisms to the da Costa–Dória approach appear in the references in those papers.

N. C. A. da Costa, F. A. Dória and E. Bir, "On the metamathematics of the P vs. NP question," to be published in Applied Mathematics and Computation (2007).
 Reviews the evidence for a conjectured consistency of P = NP with some strong axiomatic theory.

A. Syropoulos, Hypercomputation: Computing Beyond the Church–Turing Barrier, Springer (2008).
 Describes the contribution to hypercomputation theories by da Costa and Dória, and sketches their contribution to the P = NP problem.

Book List

 Francisco Antonio Doria, NCA da Costa, "On the Foundations of Science (LIVRO): Essays, First Series", Editora E-papers, 2013.
 Francisco Antonio Doria, "Chaos, Computers, Games and Time: A quarter century of joint work with Newton da Costa", Editora E-papers.
 Gregory Chaitin, Francisco A Doria, Newton C.A. da Costa, "Goedel's Way: Exploits into an undecidable world", CRC Press, 2011.
 Francisco Antonio Doria (Ed.), "The Limits Of Mathematical Modeling In The Social Sciences: The Significance Of Godel's Incompleteness Phenomenon", World Scientific, 2017.
 Shyam Wuppuluri, Francisco Antonio Doria (Eds.), "The Map and the Territory: Exploring the foundations of science, thought and reality", foreword by Sir Roger Penrose, Afterword by Dagfinn Follesdal, Springer — The frontiers Collection, 2018.
 Shyam Wuppuluri, Francisco Antonio Doria (Eds.), "Unravelling Complexity: The Life And Work Of Gregory Chaitin" World Scientific, 2020.

1945 births
Living people
Brazilian mathematicians
Brazilian philosophers
Brazilian genealogists
Brazilian chemical engineers